HMS Tarantula was an  of the Royal Navy. Launched in 1915, the gunboat saw service in both the First and Second World Wars. Tarantula served with the Tigris flotilla in 1916, retaking a former British gunboat that had previously been captured by the Ottoman Empire. After the First World War, Tarantula was towed to China, joining the China Station, eventually ending up at Trincomalee, Ceylon during the Second World War. After the end of the war, the vessel was sunk as a gunnery target in the Bay of Bengal in 1946.

Operational history 
In 1916 Tarantula along with three other gunboats were towed out to join the Royal Navy's Tigris flotilla and under the command of H.G. Sherbrooke successfully participated in a series of engagements en route to Baghdad.

After the ending of the First World War Tarantula was towed to China and joined the China Station. Around 1940 she went from Singapore to Trincomalee, Ceylon, where as a result of disrepair she served as offices. It was in this capacity that in 1944, she served briefly as Admiral Bruce Fraser's flagship of the British Pacific Fleet.

References

Publications
 

 

Insect-class gunboats
1915 ships
Maritime incidents in 1939
Maritime incidents in 1946
Shipwrecks of Sri Lanka
Shipwrecks in the Bay of Bengal
Ships sunk as targets